Neri Javier Colmenares (born December 4, 1959) is a Filipino human rights lawyer, and activist. He was an associate of the Asian Law Centre at Melbourne Law School when he was completing his Ph.D. in law on "The Writ of Amparo and the International Criminal Court." He also lectured at the University of Melbourne on International Human Rights Law and the Rome Statute of the International Criminal Court.

He was an aspirant in the 2019 senatorial elections, and is a candidate for the 2022 Philippine Senate elections as part of the 1Sambayan Senate slate.

Early life
Born in Bacolod, Negros Occidental, Colmenares joined the struggle against the late former President Ferdinand Marcos' leadership in 1976. He was active in the College Editors Guild of the Philippines (CEGP) and the Student Christian Movement of the Philippines (SCMP), and became the Visayas regional chair of the Student Catholic Action (SCA). Soon after becoming a national council member of SCA, he was arrested. Following the end of his detention, Colmenares moved to Manila where he was involved in different religious organizations. Actress Angel Locsin (Angelica Locsin Colmenares in real life) is Colmenares' aunt, although he is 25 years older than her. Reports indicate that Locsin's father and Colmenares’ father are related, but no further details were provided about the matter.

In 1983 he shifted to Cagayan Valley to become a youth organizer there. After five months of organizing work in Cagayan Valley, he was arrested by military agents and charged with 'rebellion.' In total, Colmenares was jailed and was tortured in captivity for four years. Atty. William F. Claver stood as their legal counsel. Colmenares was one of the youngest political prisoners at the time.

Law and political career
Colmenares is a human rights lawyer and is the president of the National Union of Peoples’ Lawyers (NUPL), a national association of human rights lawyers in the Philippines. He finished his Bachelor of Arts in Economics at San Beda College and completed his law degree at the University of the Philippines (UP) College of Law.

He lectures in Mandatory Continuing Legal Education (MCLE) seminars and in various universities on the Writ of Amparo, Habeas Data, The International Criminal Court and International Humanitarian Law, Oral Advocacy, Constitutional Amendment and the Chacha Cases, Judicial and Congressional Jurisprudence on Impeachment, The Party List Law: Jurisprudence of the Supreme Court and the Commission on Elections (Comelec), The Constitutionality of the Anti-Terrorism Law (Human Security Act), Whistleblowers and the Freedom of Information Law and other current legal and constitutional issues.

He acted as counsel of the seven impeachment complaints in the House of Representatives of the Philippines and was one of the prosecutors in the impeachment trial of Merceditas Navarro Gutierrez in the Philippine Senate, prosecuting mainly the fertilizer scam case and the euro generals case. He was one of the prosecutors in the impeachment trial of Chief Justice Renato Corona, who was convicted by the Senate for Betrayal of Public Trust.

He is involved in constitutional legal issues, having acted as counsel and argued before the Supreme Court in oral arguments on the constitutionality of Executive Order 464, the petition against the Emergency Rule Proclamation 1017, the calibrated preemptive response (CPR) policy, the cha cha initiative to amend the Constitution, the petition to disqualify major political parties in the party list system, on the constitutionality of the Visiting Forces Agreement (the Subic Rape Case) and the oral arguments on the petition he filed against the First Party Rule which resulted in Supreme Court decision filling up of all the party list seats in Congress.

On September 23, 2021, Colmenares announced that he will be running for senator in 2022. He filed his candidacy on October 7.

On power rate hikes 
Colmenares petitioned the Supreme Court to stop Meralco's record-high power rate hike after the 2013 Malampaya shutdown. At the 2014 congressional committee hearings on the electricity rate hike, Colmenares refuted arguments by Manila Electric Company (Meralco) legal counsel who stated that Meralco did not raise prices intentionally.

He again questioned Meralco's plans to raise electricity rates in 2019 and accused power companies of passing on to consumers the cost of shortages they themselves caused.

On Marcos heroes burial and human rights case 
Colmenares argued before the Supreme Court to stop the heroes burial for the late former president and dictator Ferdinand Marcos in 2016. He also argued before the District Court in Hawaii on the Marcos human rights case.

On joint marine exploration and irrigation loan deals with China 
In a petition filed before the Supreme Court in 2008, Colmenares questioned the legality of the Joint Marine Seismic Undertaking (JMSU) that the Arroyo administration signed with China and Vietnam. In 2014, Colmenares filed a motion for immediate resolution before the Supreme Court, citing the original petition's importance in light of the Philippines' territorial and maritime dispute with China. Colmenares filed another motion for immediate resolution on the petition in 2018. The motion read, "Any joint exploration with any foreign country or entity that allows almost absolute control over the benefits of the exploration to such foreign country or entity is detrimental to the Filipino people and therefore must not be allowed."

Colmenares questioned the Philippines' Chico River irrigation loan agreement with China in 2019. He joined fellow lawmakers in petitioning the Supreme Court in stopping the Chinese-funded project.

On TRAIN law and fuel taxes 
Colmenares and fellow lawmakers noted how the fuel excise tax and the broader value added tax hit the poor and low-income earners. He protested the Tax Reform of Inclusion and Acceleration (TRAIN) Law and the fuel excise tax and blamed these for the increasing prices of consumer goods. He also called for the removal of the value added tax on power, water, and fuel.

Colmenares served as counsel for lawmakers who in January 2018 filed for the suspension of the TRAIN Law. He also noted how the TRAIN Law was passed in Congress without a quorum.

In Congress

Legislation 
Colmenares authored several laws such as the (i) the law requiring warnings through text during typhoons and disasters (RA 10639); (ii) the law creating Special Election Precincts for persons with disabilities and senior citizens (RA 10633); (iii) the law allowing media to vote before election day (RA 10380); and human rights laws including the (iv) Reparation Law for human rights victims during Martial Law (10368); (v) the Anti-Torture Law (RA 9745); (vi) the Anti-Enforced Disappearance Law (RA 10353). He also authored the recently passed law on the practice of Nutrition and Dietetics (RA 10862). His party Bayan Muna voted NO against the TRAIN law and he has been campaigning for the suspension of the TRAIN law pending the repeal of its excise tax imposition.

He authored the Social Security System (SSS) Pension Increase bill, which was later implemented under Pres. Rodrigo Duterte who ordered a P1,000 per month increase in SSS pension in two tranches. Colmenares and Bayan Muna worked to have the second P1,000 increase in 2018.

He authored the bills and resolutions on making annulment of marriage accessible to the poor, increasing SSS pension to P7,000, investigating high prices of gasoline in the provinces, and blind-friendly Philippine peso bills.

Committee assignments 
During the 15th Congress, he was a member of the Joint Congressional Oversight Committee on Automated Elections and Vice-Chairman of the House Suffrage Committee and member of the Foreign Affairs, Defense, Natural Resources, Trade and Industry, Constitutional Amendment, Local Government, Human Rights, and Revision of Laws Committees.

He was a member of the Committee on Rules and was the Senior Deputy Minority Leader in the 16th Congress.

As organizer 

Colmenares presently holds the following positions:

 Co-chairperson, Makabayang Koalisyon ng Mamamayan
 Chairperson, Bayan Muna Partylist
 Bureau Member, International Association of Democratic Lawyers (IADL)
 Vice-President, Confederation of Lawyers in Asia-Pacific (COLAP)
 Convenor, Samahan at Ugnayan ng mga Konsyumer para sa Ikauunlad ng Bayan (SUKI) Consumers Group

Scholarly and editorial work 
Colmenares' papers include a primer on the Writ of Habeas Data, the Comparative Analysis of the Writ of Amparo, Impeachment as a Constitutional Accountability Mechanism, the Party List system Law, and the International Criminal Court and other articles for the Philippine Law Journal.

He was associate editor of the World Bulletin of the UP Law Center on the issue of international crimes.

Major legal work

He lectures for MCLE seminars and universities on: (1) Impeachment jurisprudence and constitutional law; (2) The Party List System: Representing the Marginalized in Court Litigation and Congressional Work; (3) Appellate Oral Advocacy; (4) Writ of Amparo; (5) Writ of Habeas Data; (6) International Criminal Court: International Human Rights and IHL in perspective; (7) Amending the Constitution: The Chacha Cases; (8) The Human Security Act: Criminal Law and Political Law Jurisprudence; (9) Whistleblowers Act and Freedom of Information Law: Corruption and Transparency; (10) Legislative Work for Lawyers; (11) The party list law: Comelec Accreditation and Electoral Campaign; and (12) Amnesty and the peace process: Law and Jurisprudence.

He has lectured in MCLE seminars at the Integrated Bar of the Philippines (IBP) National Convention (2011) in Subic (Writs of Personal Liberties and Human Security Act), and also for various other MCLE providers the most recent of which were the Batanggas IBP ("The Writ of Amparo") and Bohol IBP (Oral Advocacy), Mindanao Lawyers Assembly, Cagayan de Oro November 23–24, 2010; MCLE Lecture on "The Writ of Amparo," IBP-Davao, March 2010, MCLE Lecturer on "International Humanitarian Law and the International Criminal Court," IBP-Quezon City, November 22, 2009; MCLE lecture on the “Writ of Habeas Data and Rebellion Jurisprudence” sponsored by the Leyte-IBP January 2008; MCLE Lecture on the "Writ of Amparo," sponsored by the IBP-Quezon City September 12, 2008;  MCLE Lecturer on the "Writ of Amparo and Habeas Data,' sponsored by the American Bar Association and Center Law, Cagayan de Oro, October 2, 2008, and many other MCLE seminars.

 Prosecutor—2011 Impeachment Team of the House of Representatives in the Impeachment of Renato Corona
 Prosecutor—2011 Impeachment Team of the House of Representatives in the Senate Trial of Ombudsman Merci Gutierrez
 Head—2009 Impeachment Legal Team versus Pres. Gloria Arroyo (Minority Bloc—Philippine House of Representatives)
 President-National Union of Peoples Lawyers (NUPL)
 Secretary General—National Union of Peoples’ Lawyers (NUPL) 2007–2010.
 Participant and Rapporteur (July 1, 2008)—Workshop Group II, Supreme Court sponsored Forum on Economic, Social and Cultural rights "Increasing Access to Justice: Bridging Gaps and Removing Roadblocks" and the Supreme Court sponsored "Summit on Extra Judicial Killings and Disappearances" (2007).

(a)	Counsel for petitioners and argued before the Supreme Court in Hearings on the Oral Arguments in the following major cases:

(i)	The Constitutionality of the Visiting Forces Agreement and the Custody of Daniel Smith of the Subic Rape Case (Oral Arguments before the Supreme Court En Banc on September 19, 2008)

(ii)	The Constitutionality on the First Party Rule or the Panganiban Formula for on the Party List System (Oral Arguments held before the Supreme Court En Banc in Baguio, on April 22, 2008)

(iii)	The Constitutionality of Pres. Gloria Arroyo's Executive Order 464 (Oral Arguments in Bayan Muna vs. Executive Secretary held before the Supreme Court En Banc in 2007)

(iv)	The Constitutionality of the Peoples Initiative of Sigaw ng Bayan (as counsel for Intervenors Rep. Lualhati Antonino during the Oral Arguments in Lambino vs. Comelec before the Supreme Court En Banc in 2006)

(v)	The Constitutionality of the President Gloria Arroyo's Emergency Rule under Proclamation 1017 (Oral Arguments held before the Supreme Court in David vs. Executive Secretary in 2006)

(vi)	The Constitutionality of the Public Assembly Act and the Calibrated Preemptive Response (Oral Arguments in Bayan Muna vs. Executive Secretary held before the Supreme Court En Banc in 2006)

(vii)	The Disqualification of Mamamayan Ayaw sa Droga (MAD) and all the Major Political Parties from the Party-List Elections (Oral Arguments Bayan Muna vs. Comelec — 2001)

(viii)	Counsel-Petitioner in public interest cases before the Supreme Court (2007–2010) such as those involving the temporary restraining order on RFID fees imposed by the Land Transportation Office (LTO); Constitutionality of the Joint Maritime Seismic Undertaking (JMSU) between the Philippines, China and Vietnam in Spratlys; the constitutionality of the Anti-Terrorism Law; constitutionality of the National ID System; constitutionality of the US-RP Bilateral Agreement in relation to the International Criminal Court;

(b)	 Speaker in various local and international fora including MCLE Seminars and Congressional Briefings for members of Congress

•	October 21, 2009—Colloquium speaker on human rights and the Visiting Forces Agreement, University of California (UCLA), Los Angeles, United States.

•	October 19, 2009—Lecture on the “Writ of Amparo as a Legal Remedy”, US National Lawyers Guild, Seattle, USA.

•	 April 23, 2009—Speaker on Impunity and Human Rights, Australian National University (ANU), Canberra, Australia.

•	April 20, 2009—lecture on the Writ of Amparo and Impunity, Faculty of Law, University of Melbourne, Australia.

•	December 13, 2008—Speaker, International Conference on the 60th Anniversary of the Universal Declaration of Human Rights, Paris, France

•	December 10, 2008—Speaker, Amsterdam Legal Aid Board, Amsterdam, Netherlands on Legal Aid and Human Rights

•	December 9, 2008—speaker on the “Philippine Human Rights Condition”, Rice and Rights, Amsterdam.

•	November 25, 2008—Resource Speaker in the House of Representatives Hearing of the Committee on Constitutional Amendments and discussed, among others, Resolution 550 proposing the cancellation of the 2010 elections and extending the term of office of all elected public officials, including Pres. Gloria Arroyo.

•	September 10, 2008—Resource Speaker in the “Senate Congressional Hearing on Resolution 10 on Federalism and Charter Change” conducted by Sen. Richard Gordon and Senate Committee on Constitutional Amendment, the Philippine Senate.

•	September 6, 2008—Speaker, Writ of Amparo and Habeas Data, Union of Peoples’ Lawyers in Mindanao, Dipolog City

•	September 2, 2008—Supreme Court Oral Argument on the US-Philippine Visiting Forces Agreement

•	September 9, 2008—Resource Speaker in the House of Representatives Congressional Hearing on the ‘Torture Legislation” conducted by Rep. Erin Tanada and the House Committee on Human Rights

•	August 13, 2008—Lecture on the Writ of Amparo, Constitutional Law, College of Law, Far Eastern University

•	August 6, 2008—speaker on the Writ of Amparo and Habeas Data, Union of Peoples Lawyers in Mindanao, Ozamiz City

•	May 22, 2008—Speaker on the Writ of Amparo and Habeas Data, Union of Peoples Lawyers in Mindanao, General Santos City

•	May 4, 2008—speaker on Peace Process in the Philippines, Article 9 Conference, Tokyo, Japan

•	April 2008—Resource Speaker in the House of Representatives on the International Criminal Court, conducted by Rep. Antonio Cuenco of the House Committee on Foreign Affairs

•	February 8, 2007—Speaker on the Human Security Act, Moro-Christian Alliance, National Council of Churches, Quezon City

•	July 15, 2006—Keynote Speaker, “Charter Change and its Implications”, the Senate Lounge, Philippine Senate.

•	October 2005—Speaker, Congressional Briefing for members of the House of Representatives on Charter Change, Minority Conference Room, House of Representatives, Batasan.

•	October 10, 2005—Speaker on the “Constitutional Implications of the Anti-Terrorism Law” during the Congressional Briefing for Members of Congress, Minority Conference Room, House of Representatives

•	2002—Speaker on the Rome Statute of the International Criminal Court during the Congressional Briefing for Members of Congress on the International Criminal Court, 2002.

 Office of Representative Satur Ocampo, Consultant, March 1, 2004 – March 30, 2006
 Bayan Muna Partylist, General Counsel, September 19, 1999 - 2009
 National Amnesty Commission, Attorney, May 15, 1999 – September 30, 1999
 National Amnesty Commission, Attorney, January 15, 1998 – September 30, 1998
 National Amnesty Commission, Legal Officer, October 1, 1997 – May 14, 1998
 National Amnesty Commission, Private Secretary, January 2, 1997 – September 30, 1997
 National Amnesty Commission, Private Secretary, November 4, 1996 – January 1, 1997

References

Filipino activists
20th-century Filipino lawyers
Filipino Roman Catholics
Living people
Anti-revisionists
Members of the House of Representatives of the Philippines for Bayan Muna
People from Bacolod
Politicians from Negros Occidental
Academic staff of the University of Melbourne
San Beda University alumni
University of the Philippines alumni
1959 births
Marcos martial law victims
21st-century Filipino lawyers